Leptotrophon fusiformis is a species of sea snail, a marine gastropod mollusk, in the family Muricidae, the murex snails or rock snails.

Description
The length of the shell attains 16.2 mm.

Distribution
This species occurs in Papua New Guinea. in the Solomon Sea.

References

 Houart R. (2017). Description of eight new species and one new genus of Muricidae (Gastropoda) from the Indo-West Pacific. Novapex. 18(4): 81-103.

fusiformis
Gastropods described in 2017